Mani di fata (Fairy Hands) is a 1983 Italian comedy film directed by Steno.

Plot 
After a sudden dismissal, the engineer Andrea Ferrini, unable to find another job, begins to carry out the household chores. His wife Franca, on the contrary, is a career woman and she seems to wear the pants between the two.

Cast 

Renato Pozzetto as Andrea Ferrini
Eleonora Giorgi as Franca Ferrini
Sylva Koscina as Countess Irene
Maurizio Micheli as Persichetti
Felice Andreasi as The Admiral
Giovanni Frezza as Mariolino Ferrini

References

External links

Italian comedy films
1983 comedy films
1983 films
Films directed by Stefano Vanzina
Italian LGBT-related films
1983 LGBT-related films
1980s Italian-language films
1980s Italian films